Burrandana is a rural locality in the south eastern part of the Riverina.
Mangoplah.

References

External links

Towns in the Riverina
Towns in New South Wales